Lepidophora is a genus of bee flies in the family Bombyliidae. There are about nine described species in Lepidophora.

Species
These nine species belong to the genus Lepidophora:
 Lepidophora aegeriiformis Westw. g
 Lepidophora culiciformis Walker, 1850 g
 Lepidophora cuneata Painter, 1939 c g
 Lepidophora lepidocera (Wiedemann, 1828) i c g b (scaly bee fly)
 Lepidophora lutea Painter, 1962 i c g b
 Lepidophora secutor Walker, 1857 c g
 Lepidophora sumptuosum (White, 1916) c g
 Lepidophora trypoxylona Hall, 1981 c g
 Lepidophora vetusta Walker, 1857 i c g b
Data sources: i = ITIS, c = Catalogue of Life, g = GBIF, b = Bugguide.net

References

Further reading

External links

 

Bombyliidae
Articles created by Qbugbot
Bombyliidae genera